Highway is a 2002 American independent drama film written by Scott Rosenberg and directed by James Cox. It stars Jared Leto, Jake Gyllenhaal and Selma Blair.

Plot
Set in 1994, the film opens in Las Vegas with Pilot Kelson (Jake Gyllenhaal), a drug dealer, who poses as a valet and takes a customer's Rolls-Royce to give his girlfriend a ride to work. His best friend Jack Hayes (Jared Leto) is a self-employed pool cleaner, who gets caught having sex with Jilly Miranda (Kimberley Kates), the wife of Burt Miranda (Mark Rolston), an organized crime figure. While Jack escapes the initial confrontation with Miranda unharmed, Miranda sends a trio of goons (referred to throughout the remainder of the film as "Miranda's Pandas") to break Jack's feet. Jack convinces Pilot to flee and Pilot proposes they go to Seattle without telling him they're going there to see an old fling of Pilot's. 
The goons catch wind of where the two are headed and set out to hunt down Jack.

While at a diner, Jack and Pilot intervene when they discover Cassie (Selma Blair) being assaulted in the diner's parking lot. Cassie suggests that she does not know where to go so Jack offers her a lift.

On the way to Seattle, they meet Johnny the Fox (John C. McGinley), an aging stoner who tags along, save Desmond the Alligator Boy from a group of high school bullies, and ultimately end up in Seattle at the memorial for the recently departed Kurt Cobain. Pilot finds his old crush but is heartbroken to discover she doesn't remember him. Pilot meets up with Jack again and despite their attempts to evade Miranda's Pandas, they are finally cornered and they break both of Jack's feet. However, he has found love with Cassie, and the two of them decide to stay in Seattle while Jack heals. Pilot, meanwhile, decides to head back to Vegas, realizing he cares for Lucy, the girl he left behind.

Cast
 Jared Leto as Jack Hayes
 Jake Gyllenhaal as Pilot Kelson
 Selma Blair as Cassie
 John C. McGinley as Johnny the Fox
 Jeremy Piven as Scawdly
 Frances Sternhagen as Mrs. Murray
 Kimberley Kates as Jilly Miranda
 Mark Rolston as Burt Miranda
 Matthew Davis as Booty
 M. C. Gainey as Steven
 Arden Myrin as Lucy

Reception
Review aggregation website Rotten Tomatoes has not certified the film yet but the reviews have been mixed.

References

External links
 
 

2002 films
2002 crime drama films
2000s drama road movies
American crime drama films
American drama road movies
2002 directorial debut films
Films about drugs
Films directed by James Cox
Films scored by Rich Robinson
Films shot in Washington (state)
Films set in Seattle
Films with screenplays by Scott Rosenberg
2000s English-language films
2000s American films